Erskine Boyce Bowles (born August 8, 1945) is an American businessman and political figure from North Carolina. He served from 2005 to 2010 as the president of the University of North Carolina system. In 1997–98 he served as White House Chief of Staff and he also ran unsuccessfully for the United States Senate from North Carolina in 2002 and 2004.

In 2010, Bowles served as the Democratic co-chair of President Barack Obama's National Commission on Fiscal Responsibility and Reform with Alan Simpson. Bowles and Simpson founded an advocacy group, The Campaign to Fix the Debt.

Early life and education

Bowles was born and raised in Greensboro, North Carolina, and is the son of Jessamine Woodward Boyce Bowles and the late Skipper Bowles, a Democratic politician who ran unsuccessfully for Governor of North Carolina in 1972. Siblings include Hargrove Bowles III, Mary Holland Bowles Blanton and the late Martha Thomas Bowles. Bowles graduated from Virginia Episcopal School before attending the University of North Carolina at Chapel Hill, where he was a member of the Zeta Psi fraternity and graduated with a business degree. After briefly serving in the United States Coast Guard, Bowles then enrolled in Columbia Business School, where he earned an MBA.

Following graduation, Bowles worked for the financial firm Morgan Stanley in New York City, where he met his future wife, Crandall Close. The two married in 1971 and moved to North Carolina, where Bowles worked on his father's 1972 gubernatorial campaign. Crandall and Erskine have three children: Sam, Annie, and Bill. In 1975, Bowles helped launch the investment banking firm of Bowles Hollowell Conner, and remained in the corporate sector until the 1990s.

Clinton administration

In 1992, Bowles became more involved in politics as a fundraiser for Bill Clinton's 1992 presidential campaign. President Clinton appointed Bowles to head the Small Business Administration in 1993. From October 1994 to December 1995, Bowles served as Clinton's White House Deputy Chief of Staff, in the first term of the Clinton Administration. After briefly returning to Charlotte, North Carolina, where he helped found the private equity firm, Carousel Capital, Bowles was appointed Clinton's Chief of Staff in December 1996. One of Bowles's major responsibilities was dealing with federal budget negotiations between the White House and Congress. Bowles returned to Charlotte, North Carolina and to the field of finance again in October 1998. He was also asked by North Carolina Governor Jim Hunt to head a task force on rural economic prosperity.

Senatorial races

Although initially reluctant to seek political office, Bowles reconsidered a run for the United States Senate after the September 11 attacks and, in October 2001, declared his candidacy for the Senate as a Democratic candidate. Seeking to fill the seat being vacated by Jesse Helms, Bowles secured the party's nomination, but was defeated in the 2002 general election by Republican contender Elizabeth Dole.

In 2004, Bowles campaigned again for the Senate, seeking to fill the seat being vacated by fellow Democrat John Edwards. He faced Republican Richard Burr and Libertarian Tom Bailey in a hotly contested race. The final month of the Senate campaign saw both Bowles's and Burr's campaigns turn strongly negative, with Burr's campaign attacking Bowles's associations with the Clinton administration, while Bowles's campaign attacked Burr on his support of trade legislation and special interest donations. Both campaigns spent a great deal of money, making it one of the most expensive statewide races in North Carolina history.

Despite an early lead in the polls after the primaries, as well as fellow Democrat Mike Easley running for a second term as governor at the top of the state party ticket, Bowles was defeated in the 2004 race as well. President Bush's comfortable electoral victory in North Carolina likely helped Burr considerably. During his concession speech in Raleigh at the Democratic headquarters, he thanked his supporters but seemed to indicate that he would not run for office again. Quoting his father, he said there were "many ways to add to the community woodpile" and that political office was only one of them. Accordingly, in 2005 Bowles accepted an appointment as United Nations Deputy Special Envoy for Tsunami-affected Countries, once again working for Bill Clinton who was now serving as U.N. Special Envoy.

Since 2005
On October 3, 2005, Bowles was elected by the University of North Carolina's Board of Governors to succeed Molly Corbett Broad as President of the system, even though some suggest that the Board of Governors broke the law in not holding public hearings in the hiring process. One of his most significant appointments was that of Holden Thorp as the tenth chancellor of the University of North Carolina at Chapel Hill, who resigned on September 17, 2012 in the wake of several athletics-related scandals. Bowles also spoke at the campus memorial service in memory of slain student body president Eve Carson.

On February 12, 2010, Bowles announced his retirement from the UNC System. Bowles was replaced by Thomas W. Ross.

Bowles is also a member of the board of directors of General Motors, Morgan Stanley, Norfolk Southern Corporation, and North Carolina Mutual Life Insurance Company and serves on the North Carolina Advisory Board of DonorsChoose.

Bowles was appointed in 2010 to co-chair President Barack Obama's National Commission on Fiscal Responsibility and Reform with Alan K. Simpson. The commission deadlocked, and the co-chairs' report on a policy for budget deficit reduction was not adopted by the Obama administration. Surprised by the rejection, Bowles later stated he believed that Obama decided to abandon the report and let [incoming House Budget Chairman] Paul Ryan go first, and then he would look like the sensible guy in the game, based on advice from his political advisers and over the objections of his economic team.

On September 7, 2011, Facebook, Inc. announced that it had named Bowles to its board.

After North Carolina Governor Bev Perdue announced that she would not run for a second term in 2012, Bowles was mentioned as a possible candidate, and polling put him almost even with likely Republican nominee Pat McCrory. But on February 2, 2012, Bowles announced that he would not seek the governorship.

Electoral history
2004 United States Senate election in North Carolina
Richard Burr (R), 52%
Erskine Bowles (D), 47%
2002 United States Senate election in North Carolina
Elizabeth Dole (R), 54%
Erskine Bowles (D), 45%

Board membership
Bowles is also a member of the board of directors of:

 President Emeritus of the University of North Carolina 
 Directorship, Morgan Stanley
 Former Directorship, Norfolk Southern Corporation,
 Directorship, North Carolina Mutual Life Insurance Company 
 Directorship, North Carolina Advisory Board of DonorsChoose.
 Directorship, Facebook, Inc., which announced September 7, 2011, that it had named Bowles to its board.
 Directorship, Cousins Properties, Inc.
 Directorship, Belk, Inc.
 Former Directorship, General Motors
 Directorship, Committee for a Responsible Federal Budget

See also
North Carolina Democratic Party

References

General
 Clinton, Bill (2005). My Life. Vintage. .

External links
Fix the Debt

Issue positions at OnTheIssues.org

Fix the Debt campaign founded by Simpson and Bowles

1945 births
21st-century American politicians
Administrators of the Small Business Administration
Businesspeople from Greensboro, North Carolina
Candidates in the 2002 United States elections
Candidates in the 2004 United States elections
Clinton administration personnel
Columbia Business School alumni
Directors of Facebook
Directors of Morgan Stanley
Norfolk Southern Railway people
General Motors executives
Living people
North Carolina Democrats
Politicians from Greensboro, North Carolina
Presidents of the University of North Carolina System
UNC Kenan–Flagler Business School alumni
White House Chiefs of Staff
White House Deputy Chiefs of Staff
Urban Institute people
People from Charlotte, North Carolina
American academic administrators
Clinton administration cabinet members